Green Harvest may refer to:
 Green harvest
 Green Harvest (1959 film), a French war drama film
 Green Harvest (1961 film), a Spanish film